South Chuctanunda Creek is a river in Montgomery and Schenectady counties in the state of New York. It flows into the Mohawk River in Amsterdam.

History
On July 3, 1985, Congress approved a project at Amsterdam for work to be done on the Mohawk River and South Chuctanunda Creek. New flood walls were installed along the right bank of South Chuctanunda Creek and the Mohawk River. A new wing wall was installed on the left bank of South Chuctanunda Creek at the upstream end of the New York Central Railroad Bridge. The existing channel of the South Chuctanunda was slightly reshaped downstream of the Florida Avenue bridge. Construction plans for the project were issued on November 15, 1962. Construction work began on February 25, 1963, with construction being completed on June 4, 1965. The floodwalls were able to prevent $13.6 million in damages from tropical storms Lee and Irene. In July 2012, governor Cuomo announced a project to improve the flood walls on South Chuctanunda Creek and Mohawk River. The floodwalls and river banks were repaired at a cost of $164,248.

References 

Rivers of New York (state)
Rivers of Montgomery County, New York
Mohawk River